Kandathil Mathew Abraham (born 3 May 1958) is a retired Indian IAS officer who is currently serving as Chief Principal Secretary to the Chief Minister of Kerala He also serves as the Chief Executive Officer of the Kerala Infrastructure Investment Fund Board (KIIFB) and Executive Vice Chairperson of Kerala Development and Innovation Strategic Council. He retired as the Chief Secretary of Kerala in December 2017. He belongs to the 1982 batch of IAS. He was instrumental in bringing out the Sahara Group Scam when he was a member of Securities and Exchange Board of India.

Education 
Abraham did his B. Tech in Civil Engineering from University of Kerala and his M. Tech in Industrial Management from IIT Kanpur. He completed his Ph.D. from University of Michigan, Ann Arbor, USA in Technology Policy in the Urban, Technology and Environment Program (UTEP).

He is also a Chartered Financial Analyst (CFA) and has completed the Licensed International Financial Analyst (LIFA) certification.

He holds a Diploma in Business Finance, ICFAI University, India

He has completed online courses in a range of subjects that include Neural Networks and Deep Learning, Probabilistic Graphical Models, Machine Learning, Big Data, Hadoop Platform and Application Framework, R and Python Programming

Career

Early career 
Abraham started his career as a Lecturer in Civil Engineering in the TKM College of Engineering under the University of Kerala. He then joined the IAS in 1982 and served as Assistant Collector (Under Training) in Kollam District. After his training he served as Sub Collector as Sub Collector in both Ernakulam and Thiruvananthapuram Districts .

District Collector 
He was District Collector in Alappuzha and Ernakulam Districts during the period 1994–1996. During this period, he officiated as Mayor of the Kochi City Corporation for a brief period.

Secretary in Finance Department 
He was Secretary in Finance Department from 1996–2002. During this period, he is credited to have led the Modernizing Government Programme (MGP) – the first comprehensive governance and fiscal reforms programme at the State level in the country financed by the Asian Development Bank (ADB), with supplementary grant support by the Government of Netherlands (RNE), and the Government of United Kingdom (DFID).

The Management Information Systems used in the State for Budgeting and in Treasury operations are credited to him during this period.

During this time he drafted the original legislation for establishing the Kerala Infrastructure Investment Fund in 1999 – precursor to the current KIIFB.

Professor of Finance, Asian School of Business 
In 2006, he took a sabbatical to serve as the Professor of Finance for one year in the Asian School of Business [*] at Thiruvananthapuram.

Visiting Faculty, IIT Kanpur 
He also served as a Visiting Faculty in the Indian Institute of Technology, Kanpur between 2003 and 2007 in the Industrial Management and Engineering Department

Secretary/Principal Secretary

(Higher Education, Revenue and Food and Civil Supplies & Science and Technology, Personnel & Administrative Reforms Departments) 
He has also served for various stints as Secretary in Higher Education, Revenue and Food and Civil Supplies and the Personnel & Administrative Reforms Departments before he took up an assignment as Whole Time Member in the Securities and Exchange Board of India.

Whole Time Member – SEBI 
He served as Whole Time Member in Securities and Exchange Board of India from 2008 to 2011. During his tenure at SEBI, he exposed the financial irregularities at Sahara Group which culminated in the Supreme Court of India upholding his judgement as Member. As on 31 March 2021, SEBI had recovered Rs.15,473 crore out of Rs.23,000 crore from the Sahara Group of Companies (SHICL and SIRECL), making this the biggest penalty levied in the financial markets to date .

He was in charge of the Secondary Markets, Investigation and Surveillance Divisions and the International Affairs Division in SEBI during his tenure at SEBI.

Additional Chief Secretary – Higher Education 
In 2011–2014, he served as the Additional Chief Secretary in Higher Education.

During this period, the largest skilling programme (Additional Skills Acquisition Programme (ASAP) was initiated in colleges and schools, with assistance from the Asian Development Bank (ADB).

He is credited with having drafted the legislation for granting autonomy to colleges in Kerala. Twenty three colleges in Kerala were granted autonomy under this framework.

Several key programmes like Fostering Linkages in Academic Innovation and. Research (FLAIR), Walk with a Scholar (WWS), the Honors Programme at  Graduate Levels in English, Mathematics, Economics and Commerce were initiated by him.

He has also served as the Vice Chancellor in four Universities (Kerala, Mahatma Gandhi, Cochin University of Science and Technology (CUSAT) and Kannur Universities) during his time for various periods.

Additional Chief Secretary – Social Justice 
He served concurrently as Additional Chief Secretary in Social Justice Department in 2012–14.

The Nirbhaya Programme for women in distress, the country's first Cochlear Implant Programme, the first State Policy for Transgenders, Early Intervention Programmes for Disabilities, and the National Institute of Physical Education and Medical Research (NIPMER) in Thrissur District are projects and programmes credited to his leadership.

Additional Chief Secretary – Finance 
During 2014–2017 he served as the Finance Secretary in Government.

It was during this period that the Kerala Infrastructure Investment Fund Act was amended.  KIIFB, fully equipped to leverage the innovations in financial markets in India came into existence. He was appointed as Chief Executive Officer, KIIFB and continues to serve in that role.

Chief Secretary 
He retired as Chief Secretary in the Government of Kerala in December 2017.

Current roles in Government of Kerala 

 Chief Principal Secretary to the Chief Minister of Kerala
 Chief Executive Officer, KIIFB
 Executive Vice Chairperson, Kerala Development and Innovation Strategic Council (K-DISC)

Membership in Professional Bodies 

 (Member) Chartered Financial Analyst Institute, USA 
 (Member) Global Association of Risk Professionals (GARP)

Areas of academic interest 

 Emerging Technology Adoption in Public Sector (Blockchain, Deep Learning, Internet of Things)
 Corporate Finance, Financial Accounting, Management Accounting, Securities Analysis, Risk Management, Debt Markets, Portfolio Management, Public Finance.

Awards and Honors 

 16th Archbishop Mar Gregorious Award for outstanding service to social justice (2018)
 One of the top ten Personality Brand Names selected by Dhanam Magazine (2018)
 Special Award by Campaign for Judicial Accountability and Reforms with National Campaign for People’s right to Information for integrity, honesty and professional excellence (2017)
 Satyendra K Dubey Memorial Award conferred by the Indian Institute of Technology, Kanpur Alumni Association for displaying highest professional integrity and honesty (2016)
 GFiles Governance Award for Exceptional Achievement (2014)
 Selected by India Today among top ten bureaucrats in the State of Kerala (2014)

References 

Living people
1957 births
Indian Administrative Service officers from Kerala
Civil Servants from Kerala
District magistrate